Chelat Achutha Menon (13 January 1913 – 16 August 1991) was an Indian politician and lawyer who served as the 4th Chief Minister of Kerala from November 1969 to August 1970 and again from October 1970 to 1977. He is viewed as one of the most influential Chief Ministers of Kerala.

Personal life 
He was born in a Hindu Nair family to Madathiveettil Achutha Menon (after whom he was named) and Lekshmykutty Amma at Puthukkad, Thrissur District on 13 January 1913. His brother-in-law V. V. Raghavan was also a Communist Party of India politician from Thrissur city. V. V. Raghavan was the Member of Parliament from Thrissur Lok Sabha constituency, in 1996 and 1998. He was married to Ammini Amma, and had three children including 2 daughters and V. Ramankutty.

Education 
Being a brilliant student, he studied on merit scholarship throughout his student life, and stood first in the SSLC examination in the then State of Kochi. He is a former student of Church Mission Society High School, Thrissur (CMSHSS, Thrissur) And after finishing the intermediate level in St. Thomas College, Thrissur, he continued his college education in the St. Joseph's College, Tiruchirappalli Madras. There he won a gold medal for academic excellence and was a role model for other fellow students. Menon, then went on to study Law in Government Law College, Thiruvananthapuram and scored the highest marks in Hindu Law. After the B.L. degree, he started legal practice in various courts of Thrissur, during which time he began to get involved in many social issues.

Political life 
Achutha Menon started his political career by associating himself with the State Congress, and actively took part in the Congress meeting held at Thrissur. He subsequently became a member of the Kochi rajya prajamandalam. He joined the Communist Party of India in 1941 through his involvement in the "Labour Brotherhood" movement. Menon became a Member of the Central Committee of the Communist Party of India and a member of its Executive Committee and Central Secretariat. He continued his political activities, even when the Communist Party was banned. He was imprisoned for many years. The first imprisonment Achutha Menon underwent was in 1940, for one year for making an anti-war speech; and the next in the wake of the "Quit India" movement of 9 August 1942 as a detainee for more than a year. He was forced to evade arrest and live "underground" for more than three years during the period 1948–51.

Legislative career 

Achutha Menon was elected to the Travancore-Cochin State Legislature while "underground" in 1952. When Kerala became a separate state in 1956, Achutha Menon prepared a pamphlet in which he beautifully expressed his dreams of future Kerala. The pamphlet titled "Towards a more prosperous and plentiful Kerala", became the manifesto of the Communist Party in the general elections held in 1957. The election witnessed the political victory of the Communist Party, and Kerala
became the second state in the world in which the communist party came to
power through the ballot paper. Achutha Menon also became elected to the Kerala Legislative Assembly,  thus becoming the first Finance & Agricultural Minister of Kerala in the Ministry headed by E.M.S. Namboodirippad in 1957. He presented the first Budget of Kerala state on 7 June 1957. As the so-called Vimochanasamaram (Liberation Struggle) gained momentum the Home Minister was found unfit to handle the situation and was divested of the crucial portfolio which then was handed over to Menon. He was again elected to the Kerala Legislative Assembly in 1960. Menon also became a member of the Rajyasabha during 1968–69.

Split of Communist Party 
During the Communist Party split, he continued to remain with the CPI. The political instability during the late sixties had paved the way for a realignment in coalition politics, which had far reaching implication on the political history of the state. He was elected as the State Secretary of C.P.I. too, many times, and was also a member of the National Council of the C.P.I.

Chief Minister of Kerala 
In the 1967 Kerala Legislative Assembly election, his party contested as part of a seven-party alliance named Saptakakshi Munnani. E. M. S. Namboodiripad was sworn in as the Chief Minister but had to resign in 1969 due to internal dissensions within the alliance. Following this, the CPI exited from the coalition and constituted a mini-front which formed government with the external support from Indian National Congress. Achutha Menon was sworn in as Chief Minister on 1 November 1969. Noted as one of the best chief ministers Kerala has had, he continued till the dissolution of the third Kerala Legislative Assembly. The split in the Indian Socialist Party, a coalition partner and group politics within the Congress party led to the fall of his government on 1 August 1970.

It was under his stewardship that Kerala signed on for continuing with the Mullaperiar Dam agreement with Tamil Nadu, as a part of reviewing the pre-independence agreement between the Kingdom of Travancore and the Madras Presidency. This agreement, experts on the subject believe, frittered away the interests of Kerala and became the prime reason for unenviable situation that Kerala finds itself today in the Mullaperiar issue. He was not a member of the Kerala Assembly then, but subsequently got elected from Kottarakkara (State Assembly constituency) in the by-election held in April 1970. In the mid-term poll conducted in 1970, he was again elected this time from Kodakara in Thrissur District and was sworn in as Chief Minister on 4 October 1970 and held office till 1977. Sree Chitra Tirunal Institute for Medical Sciences and Technology, Trivandrum was set up during his period. His ministry continued in power for about seven years and implemented reform measures of basic importance such as the Land Reform Act, take-over of private forests without compensation, law on agricultural labour, gratuity of industrial workers, one-lakh housing scheme, etc., not to mention significant steps towards industrialization of Kerala. It was this ministry which enunciated a Science Policy and established a number of "Centres of Excellence" in Scientific research in the state. Many institutions like Keltron, NATPAC were started during his tenure.

Achutha Menon retired from active politics in 1977. He suffered multiple health problems during the final years of his life. He died on 16 August 1991, aged 78, at Sree Chithira Thirunal Hospital in Thiruvananthapuram after suffering from a massive heart attack. Incidentally, the place where he died was set up during his period. He was cremated with full state honours at Thrissur, his hometown.

Developmental works 
He started a lot of institutions for industrialization and inclusive development of Kerala. More than 50 institutions in the fields of science, technology, public health, planning, housing, education, social sciences,  geology, forest protection, water management, environment conservation and so on were started. 

In the fields of social sciences, research, environment and technology institutions such as Centre for Development Studies, Electronic Research and Development Center (C-DAC Trivandrum), Regional Research Laboratory, National Centre for Earth Science Studies, Kerala Forest Research Institute, Centre for Water Resources Development and Management (CWRDM) were set up during his tenure as chief minister of Kerala. 

He pioneered industrial development in Kerala by helping K. P. P. Nambiar set up Kerala State Electronics Development Corporation (KELTRON) in 1973. He was instrumental in bringing Apollo Tyres company to Kerala. The two specialized universities of the state namely the Kerala Agricultural University and Cochin University of Science and Technology were started during his tenure. In field of health care Sree Chitra Tirunal Institute for Medical Sciences and Technology, Trivandrum was started during his ministry.

The Kerala State Planning Board, constituted by Second Namboodiripad Ministry was strengthened during his period as the chairperson.

In 1985, a non profit organisation named Centre of Science and Technology for Rural Development (COSTFORD) was formed by him along with K. N. Raj and Laurie Baker.

Literary works 
A talented writer, Shri. Achutha Menon had authored many books. He wrote many books and articles, mostly related to Marxism, Communism and Indian History. He also translated H.G. Wells' "Brief History of the World" into Malayalam. "Soviet Land", "Kissan Padha Pusthakam", "Keralam – Prasnangalum Sadhyadhakalum", "Smaranayude Edukal", and "Manushyan Swayam Nirmikkunnu" (Translation) are his other famous works. Along with those, he has contributed many noteworthy articles in newspapers and periodicals.

See also 

 K. P. P. Nambiar

References

Further reading

External links
Profile at keralacm.gov.in

1913 births
1991 deaths
Chief Ministers of Kerala
Malayali politicians
Politicians from Thrissur
St. Thomas College, Thrissur alumni
Government Law College, Thiruvananthapuram alumni
Communist Party of India politicians from Kerala
Chief ministers from Communist Party of India
Kerala MLAs 1960–1964
Kerala MLAs 1967–1970
Kerala MLAs 1970–1977
Rajya Sabha members from Kerala
Recipients of the Kerala Sahitya Akademi Award
Indian independence activists from Kerala
Indian independence activists
Prisoners and detainees of British India